Al-Khaburah Sports Club is an Omani football club based in Al-Khaburah, Al Batinah Region, Oman. The club is currently playing in the Oman Professional League, top division of Oman Football Association. Their home ground is Sohar Regional Sports Complex. The stadium is government owned, but they also own their own personal stadium and sports equipment, as well as their own training facilities.

Being a multisport club
Although being mainly known for their football, Al-Khaboura SC like many other clubs in Oman, have not only football in their list, but also hockey, volleyball, handball, basketball, badminton and squash. They also have various youth football teams competing in Oman Olympic League, Oman Youth League (U-19) and Oman Youth League (U-17).

Crest and colours
Al-Khaboura SC have been known since establishment to wear a full yellow (with green stripes on the trim) kit (usually a darker shade of pale yellow). They have also had many different sponsors over the years. As of now, Kelme provides them with kits.

Honours and achievements
Oman First Division League (1): 
Winners 2013–14
Oman Youth League (U-19) (1):
Winners 2000–01
Sultan Qaboos Cup U-19 (1):
Winners 2002

International titles
Gulf Club Champions Cup U-17 (2):
Winners 2003, 2004
Runners-up 2000

Personnel

Technical staff

Management

Presidential history

References

External links
Al-Khaburah Club – SOCCERWAY
Al-Khaburah Club – GOALZZ.com
Al-Khaburah Club – KOOORA
Al-Khaburah Club – ofa.om

Football clubs in Oman
Oman Professional League
Association football clubs established in 1972
1972 establishments in Oman